Michael Nader (February 19, 1945 – August 23, 2021) was an American actor, known for his roles as Dex Dexter on the ABC primetime soap opera Dynasty from 1983 to 1989, and Dimitri Marick on the ABC daytime soap opera All My Children from 1991 to 2001, and in 2013. He also starred as Kevin Thompson on the soap opera As the World Turns from 1975 to 1978.

Early life
Nader was born on February 19, 1945, in St. Louis, Missouri. He was of German and Yugoslavian descent. Nader was a nephew of actor George Nader. His parents split a few months after his birth. At the age of six, he was hit by a drunk driver, which left him with a visible facial scar. Nader accompanied his mother, Minette, when she moved to Los Angeles to pursue an entertainment career.

At 16, Nader was one of three young surfers featured in a September 1961 Life photo with George Jones spread accompanying the article "The Mad, Happy Surfers: A Way of Life on the Wavetops". He graduated from Palisades Charter High School in 1963.

Career
Nader began his acting career in 1963 with small roles in several of American International Pictures Beach Party films, then billed as "Mike Nader". He later appeared in the recurring role of Siddo in the 1965–66 TV series Gidget, and had a small role in the 1968 film Blue. Nader's first soap opera role was playing Kevin Thompson on As the World Turns from 1975 to 1978. In 1983, he appeared in the NBC prime time soap opera Bare Essence as Alexi Theopolis.

Nader won the role of Farnsworth "Dex" Dexter, the eventual third husband of Alexis Colby (Joan Collins), on the prime time soap opera Dynasty in 1983. He remained on the series until its cancellation in 1989.

Nader appeared as Nazi officer Burchhardt in the 1988 television film The Great Escape II: The Untold Story. The same year, he co-starred as Nick Scalfone in the TV movie Lady Mobster. In 1990, he appeared as Enzio Bonnatti in the miniseries Lucky Chances.

Nader returned to soap operas in 1991, portraying Dimitri Marick, the husband of Erica Kane (Nader's Lady Mobster costar Susan Lucci), on the daytime drama All My Children. He played the role from 1991 to 1999 and from 2000 to 2001. Nader returned for All My Children online revival in 2013.

Nader also appeared in episodes of other television series, including The Flash (1991), Law And Order: SVU (2002), and Cold Case (2009).

Personal life
Nader dated actress Ellen Barber for ten years, with the relationship ending around the same time as his role on As the World Turns. Nader married Robin Weiss in June 1984, and a month later they had a daughter. He was married to Jodi Lister at the time of his death, with the couple having been together for 18 years.

In 1984, Nader admitted to previously having drug and drinking problems, which prompted him to become sober in 1980. He was charged with drunk driving in 1997, and in 2001 was arrested for attempting to sell cocaine to an undercover police officer. Nader was let go from his role on All My Children soon after, with a statement from ABC that if he resolved his issues they would rehire him. They never did, and Nader sued the network, alleging that they never intended to bring him back to the show at all.

Nader died on August 23, 2021, at the age of 76 at his home, ten days after being diagnosed with an untreatable form of cancer.

Filmography

Film

Television

References

External links
 

1945 births
2021 deaths
20th-century American male actors
21st-century American male actors
American male soap opera actors
American male television actors
Male actors from St. Louis
Deaths from cancer in California